Statistics of Emperor's Cup in the 1952 season.

Overview
It was contested by 16 teams, and All Keio won the championship.

Results

1st Round
All Keio 4–0 Sendai Soccer
Toyo Industries 3–2 Rokko Club
All Rikkyo – (retired) Hokkaido
Kariya Soccer 0–2 Kwangaku Club
Shida Soccer 3–0 Toyama Soccer
Matsuyama Club 2–2 (lottery) Meiji University
Tokyo University of Education 6–0 Niraha Club
Shimabara Club 0–4 Osaka Club

Quarterfinals
All Keio 3–0 Toyo Industries
All Rikkyo 0–1 Kwangaku Club
Shida Soccer 3–0 Matsuyama Club
Tokyo University of Education 1–2 Osaka Club

Semifinals
All Keio 1–0 Kwangaku Club
Shida Soccer 1–3 Osaka Club

Final

All Keio 6–2 Osaka Club
All Keio won the championship.

References
 NHK

Emperor's Cup
1952 in Japanese football